Miantang-e Olya (also Romanized as Mīāntang-e ‘Olyā) is a village in Kakavand-e Sharqi Rural District, Kakavand District, Delfan County, Lorestan Province, Iran. At the 2006 census, its population was 68, in 16 families.

References 

Towns and villages in Delfan County